The 1978 British Formula One Championship (formally the 1978 Aurora AFX F1 Championship) was the first season of the British Formula One Championship. It commenced on 24 March 1978 and ended on 24 September after twelve races.

The Aurora AFX F1 Championship replaced the Shellsport Group 8 series that had been run in 1976 and 1977 to Formula Libre rules. As part of the changes, Formula 5000 and Formula Atlantic cars were no longer eligible to race in the Aurora AFX championship. Formula 1 cars were now the focus of the series, with Formula 2 cars still being permitted as a 'B-class'.

Teams and drivers

Results and standings

Races

Drivers' standings
Points are awarded to the top ten classified finishers using the following structure:

References

British Formula One Championship
Formula One